St. George  is a city in Aleutians West Census Area, Alaska, United States. At the 2010 census the population was 102, down from 152 in 2000. It is the main settlement of St. George Island in the Pribilofs, a small island group in the Bering Sea.

Geography
St. George is located at  (56.605546, −169.559584).

The city is served by an airport with scheduled service to St. Paul Island Airport and Unalaska Airport provided by Grant Aviation.

Climate

Demographics

St. George first appeared on the 1880 U.S. Census as an unincorporated Aleut village. Of its 92 residents, 88 were Aleut and 4 were White. It returned again in 1890 with 93 residents, reporting 49 Natives (presumably Aleut), 36 Creoles (Mixed Russian & Native), and 8 Whites. It did not report on the 1900 census. From 1910–40, it reported as "St. George Island." In 1950, it reported as St. George. In 1960, it reported again as "St. George Island." From 1970-onwards, it has reported as St. George. It formally incorporated in 1983.

As of the census of 2000, there were 152 people, 51 households, and 42 families residing in the city. The population density was 4.4 people per square mile (1.7/km2). There were 67 housing units at an average density of 1.9 per square mile (0.7/km2). The racial makeup of the city was 92.11% Alaska Native and 7.89% White.

There were 51 households, out of which 47.1% had children under the age of 18 living with them, 54.9% were married couples living together, 15.7% had a female householder with no husband present, and 17.6% were non-families. 15.7% of all households were made up of individuals, and none had someone living alone who was 65 years of age or older. The average household size was 2.98 and the average family size was 3.29.

In the city, the age distribution of the population shows 36.8% under the age of 18, 5.3% from 18 to 24, 31.6% from 25 to 44, 19.7% from 45 to 64, and 6.6% who were 65 years of age or older. The median age was 33 years. For every 100 females, there were 92.4 males. For every 100 females aged 18 and over, there were 113.3 males.

The median income for a household in the city was $57,083, and the median income for a family was $60,625. Males had a median income of $50,625 versus $31,250 for females. The per capita income for the city was $21,131. About 4.9% of families and 7.9% of the population were below the poverty line, including 4.0% of those under the age of eighteen and none of those 65 or over.

Education

St. George is served by the Pribilof Island School District. In 2004, the district began offering 9–12th grade to St. George students via video conference. Students have a choice: they can live at home and attend distance education classes or they can leave home and attend a boarding school like Mt. Edgecumbe High School.

In 2017, St. George School was closed entirely due to low enrollment. The district now offers a correspondence program for grades K-10.

References

External links

St. George Tanaq Corporation 

Cities in Alaska
Cities in Aleutians West Census Area, Alaska
Historic American Buildings Survey in Alaska
Populated coastal places in Alaska on the Pacific Ocean
Populated places established in 1983
1983 establishments in Alaska
Pribilof Islands